Augusta Victoria of Hohenzollern (19 August 1890 – 29 August 1966) was the daughter of William, Prince of Hohenzollern, and Princess Maria Teresa of Bourbon-Two Sicilies. In 1913, she married the deposed King Manuel II of Portugal. After his death, Augusta Victoria married a second time. She had no children from either marriage.

Family
She was born in Potsdam, a daughter of William, Prince of Hohenzollern, sometime heir presumptive to the throne of the kingdom of Romania, (1864–1927) and his first wife Princess Maria Teresa of Bourbon-Two Sicilies, niece of Empress Sissi.

First marriage

On 4 September 1913, at Sigmaringen Castle, Augusta Victoria married King Manuel II of Portugal. He had succeeded to the Portuguese throne with the assassination of his father, Carlos I of Portugal, and older brother, Luís Filipe, Duke of Braganza, on 1 February 1908. He had been deposed by the 5 October 1910 revolution, resulting in the establishment of the Portuguese First Republic. The bride was twenty-three years-old and the groom twenty-four. They were second cousins, both being great-grandchildren of Queen Maria II of Portugal and King Ferdinand II of Portugal. Manuel died on 2 July 1932, at Fulwell Park, Twickenham, Middlesex, England. There were no children from this marriage.

Second marriage
On 23 April 1939, Augusta Victoria married again. Her second husband, Count Robert Douglas von Langenstein, was the 13th head of the Swedish comital house of Douglas, lord of Langenstein Castle in Baden, and heir of the Mühlhausen fideicommiss/entail (the eldest son of Count Ludvig Douglas). They were also related, being third cousins twice removed, both descending from Charles Frederick, Grand Duke of Baden. The bride was almost 49 years old and the groom 59. There were no children from this marriage either. Douglas died on 26 August 1955. Augusta died at Eigeltingen, Baden-Württemberg, Germany, 10 days after her birthday at the age of 76.

Ancestry

References

Sources

 McNaughton, C. Arnold. The Book of Kings: A Royal Genealogy

|-

1890 births
1966 deaths
People from Potsdam
People from the Province of Brandenburg
House of Braganza-Saxe-Coburg and Gotha
Portuguese royalty
Princesses of Hohenzollern-Sigmaringen
House of Douglas and Angus
Portuguese queens consort
Remarried royal consorts